Shahi may refer to:

Dynasties 
Adil Shahi dynasty
Barid Shahi dynasty, which ruled the Bidar Sultanate
Hussain Shahi dynasty
Ilyas Shahi dynasty
Imad Shahi dynasty, which ruled the Berar Sultanate
Kabul Shahi (disambiguation) dynasty
Turk Shahi dynasty
Hindu Shahi dynasty
Nizam Shahi dynasty, which ruled the Ahmadnagar Sultanate
Qutb Shahi dynasty
Shahi Bangalah, another name for the Bengal Sultanate

People 
Sahi clan or Shahi, a clan of Muslim, Khatri (kshatri) and Sikh Jats found in Punjab region of Pakistan and India
Agha Shahi (1920–2006), Pakistani foreign minister
Laliteshwar Prasad Shahi (1920–2018), Congress party politician from Bihar
Ram Vinay Shahi, electrical company executive
Riaz Ahmed Gohar Shahi (born 1941), Muslim Sufi author, spiritual leader and founder of the spiritual movement Anjuman Serfaroshan-e-Islam
Sarah Shahi (born 1980), TV actress

Other uses 
Shahi, Uttar Pradesh, a town in Bareilly District, India
 name of the town Qaem Shahr in northern Iran until 1979
Shahi Bridge, (ce 1567) in Jaunpur, India

See also